The Pacific Art League (PAL), formally known as the Palo Alto Art Club was founded in 1921 in Palo Alto, California and is a membership-run nonprofit arts organization, school, and gallery. The group is located in a historic building at 668 Ramona Street in downtown Palo Alto.

About 
The Pacific Art League employs roughly 35-40 instructors and as of 2017, has over 2,000 students enrolled per quarter. Classes are on a quarterly system, and additionally they offer workshops and summer camps. From 2019–2020, director of PAL was Lisa Coscino.

History 
The Palo Alto Art Club was founded in 1921. The initial founders of the club were around 40 artists of upper class and many were connected to Stanford University. In the beginning the club met at member's houses, later they met at the Palo Alto Library, and by 1926, they moved to 340 Melville Avenue. In 1952, the group moved to 855 Cowper Street due to the popularity of classes. Over time the club became more democratic and community-centered, it is now a nonprofit.

In 1965, PAL purchased thebuilding and moved to its current location at 668 Ramona Street, in a historical Spanish Revival building designed by Birge Clark. In 2014, the building had a $4 million renovation which included compliance with the American Disabilities Act and seismic retrofit.

In 1984, the name changed from Palo Alto Art Club to the current, Pacific Art League.

Notable artists 
This is a list of notable artists that were members, teachers of the Pacific Art League and/or showed their art work in the exhibitions, listed by last name in alphabetical order.

See also 
 Allied Arts Guild

References

External links 
 Official website

1921 establishments in California
Palo Alto, California
Organizations based in Palo Alto, California
Art museums and galleries in California
Arts centers in California
Tourist attractions in Santa Clara County, California
Buildings and structures in Palo Alto, California
American artist groups and collectives
Organizations based in the San Francisco Bay Area
Art in the San Francisco Bay Area